A Saudi citizen, Fahad al-Shehri was deported from Canada in 1997 on charges he had engaged in terrorism.

He was a known associate of Mohamed Harkat, a Canadian accused of links to the Algerian Groupe Islamique Armé.

References

Saudi Arabian emigrants to Canada
Living people
People deported from Canada
Canada–Saudi Arabia relations
Year of birth missing (living people)
Place of birth missing (living people)